The United Nations Educational, Scientific and Cultural Organization (UNESCO) World Heritage Sites are the places of important cultural or natural heritage as described in the UNESCO World Heritage Convention, established in 1972. Argentina accepted the UNESCO World Heritage Convention on 23 August 1978, making its historical sites eligible for inclusion on the list.

Argentina had its first site included on the list at the 5th session of World Heritage Committee, held in Sydney, Australia, in October 1981. At that session, "Los Glaciares National Park" was inscribed on the list. , 3 elements have been inscribed on the Intangible cultural heritage and 11 sites have been inscribed on the World Heritage List: 6 cultural sites and 5 natural sites. A further 10 sites have been proposed for inscription and are on the tentative list.

World Heritage Sites 

Name: as listed by the World Heritage Committee
Location: Province where the site is located. If the site is a trans-border site the other countries will be listed in a note.
Coordinates: geographic coordinates of the site's location
Date of inscription: Year and session the site was added to the World Heritage list
Criteria: The criteria it was listed under: criteria (i) through (vi) are cultural, while (vii) through (x) are natural
Description: brief description of the site as listed by the World Heritage Committee
ID: Reference number given by UNESCO

Tentative list 

In addition to the sites inscribed on the World Heritage List, member states can maintain a list of tentative sites that they may consider for nomination. Nominations for the World Heritage List are only accepted if the site was previously listed on the tentative list. As of 2017, Argentina recorded 6 sites on its tentative list.

Name: as listed by the World Heritage Committee
Location: Province where is located and geographic coordinates of the site
Date of submission: Date the site was submitted to the Tentative List
Criteria: The criteria it was listed under: criteria (i) through (vi) are cultural, while (vii) through (x) are natural
Description: brief description of the site
ID: Reference number given by UNESCO

Intangible Cultural Heritage

See also
 Table of World Heritage Sites by country
 List of World Heritage Sites by year of inscription

Notes

References

External links

 Argentina at UNESCO World Heritage Convention

Argentina
World Heritage Sites